Blepharita flavistigma is a moth of the family Noctuidae. It is found in Bengal, Dalhousie and Darjeeling.

Cuculliinae
Moths of Asia
Moths described in 1867